You Can't Cheat an Honest Man is a 1939 American comedy film directed by George Marshall and Edward F. Cline and starring W. C. Fields. Fields also wrote the story on which the film is based under the name Charles Bogle.

Plot 
Circus proprietor Larsen E. Whipsnade is struggling to keep a step ahead of foreclosure, and clearly not paying his performers, including Edgar Bergen and Charlie McCarthy (Bergen's ventriloquist's dummy/alter-ego, whom Whipsnade hates) Whipsnade's co-ed daughter pays a visit and falls in love with Bergen, but after she sees the financial mess that her father is in, she decides to marry Roger, a tiresome young millionaire. Whipsnade initially approves of the marriage, and just to be sure that the penniless Bergen doesn't win out (and make McCarthy an in-law), he sets the pair adrift in a hot-air balloon. However, Whipsnade creates a scene at the engagement party, and father and daughter escape together in a chariot, with Bergen and McCarthy in pursuit.

Cast
 W. C. Fields as Larsen E. Whipsnade
 Edgar Bergen as Himself and the characters Charlie McCarthy and Mortimer Snerd 
 Constance Moore as Vicky Whipsnade
 John Arledge as Phineas Whipsnade
 Eddie Anderson as Rochester
 James Bush as Roger Bel-Goodie
 Mary Forbes as Mrs. Bel-Goodie
 Thurston Hall as Mr. Bel-Goodie
 Grady Sutton as Chester
 Princess Baba as Herself
 Charles Coleman as Butler
 Edward Brophy as Corbett
 Arthur Hohl as Burr
 Blacaman as Himself
 Ferris Taylor as Deputy Sheriff
 Ivan Lebedeff as Ronnie

Production background
The film's whimsical title comes from a line spoken by Fields about ten minutes into the film. Whipsnade says that his grandfather Litvak's last words, spoken "just before they sprung the trap", were: "You can't cheat an honest man; never give a sucker an even break, or smarten up a chump." The line expands on his character's comment to his daughter in the musical Poppy (1923): "Let me give you just one bit of fatherly advice: Never give a sucker an even break." (This is the title of a subsequent Fields film, made in 1941.) The character name is obviously a play on "larceny", a point which Fields reinforces at one point when someone calls him "Larceny Whipsnake".

The film features Edgar Bergen and Charlie McCarthy, capitalizing on the popularity of their ongoing radio "feud" with Fields.

According to historian William K. Everson, the film has three directors. George Marshall, the credited director, did not get along with Fields, so he worked mostly with the other cast members, while Eddie Cline was brought in to work with Fields, who had worked previously with Cline and liked him. (Cline in fact went on to direct Fields' next three films.) B. Reeves Eason was the second-unit director, helming the chase scenes and other action-oriented material.

In popular culture
 Fields' character in this film would inspire the authors of the comic strip The Wizard of Id to create a shady lawyer character, a Fields caricature named "Larsen E. Pettifogger".
 A scene from the film is featured in the opening to Dummy (2002).

References

External links
 
 
 
 

1939 films
1939 comedy films
American comedy films
American black-and-white films
Circus films
Films directed by Edward F. Cline
Films directed by George Marshall
Films scored by Frank Skinner
Universal Pictures films
1930s American films
1930s English-language films
English-language comedy films